T. K. Kurien is an Indian chartered accountant and business executive. Kurien is Managing Partner and Chief Investment Officer at Premji Invest, a venture capital company set up by Azim Premji. Prior to that he was the Executive Vice Chairman at Wipro Limited, chaired by Premji. He was also a member of the Wipro Corporate Executive Council.

Career
Prior to taking over the role as CEO of the IT business in Feb 2011, Kurien was President of Wipro's recently launched Eco Energy business. In June 2008, he took on the responsibility of heading Wipro's Consulting arm, WCS (Wipro Consulting Services) establishing it as a distinct offering by Wipro. From 2004 to 2008, TK headed Wipro BPO. In February 2003, he became the Chief Executive of Healthcare & Life Sciences, a new business segment of Wipro Ltd formed in April 2002 to address the market opportunities in Healthcare and Life Science IT. In his early years at Wipro, Kurien started the Telecom Internet Service Provider business.

Before joining Wipro, Kurien served as the CEO of GE X Ray from October 1997 to January 2000 and prior to that was the CFO of GE Medical Systems (South Asias). TK now is the Chief Investment Offìcer at Premji Invest.

Personal life
Kurien studied at the Hyderabad Public School. He is a chartered accountant by qualification, being a member of Institute of Chartered Accountants of India (ICAI). He spends his spare time reading books on history and strategy.

References

External links
 T K Kurien Profile at Wipro

Living people
Businesspeople in software
Indian chief executives
Businesspeople from Bangalore
Wipro
Indian accountants
Year of birth missing (living people)
Place of birth missing (living people)